Clemente Sanchez (born June 24, 1958) is an American politician and businessman who served as a member of the New Mexico Senate for the 30th district from January 15, 2013 to 2021. Clemente is the CEO and president of the Bank of New Mexico, a subsidiary of Triumph Bancorp.

Early life and education
Sanchez was born in Cubero, New Mexico. He earned his BBA in accounting from Eastern New Mexico University and his MBA from New Mexico Highlands University.

Career 
In 1991, Sanchez became director of the New Mexico State University Grants Small Business Development Center.

In May 2007, Sanchez began working at the Bank of New Mexico as chief executive. In September 2015, it was announced that Sanchez would become CEO of the bank. As part of taking the position, he announced that he would be retiring as director of the New Mexico State University-Grants Small Business Development Center.

Elections
In 2008, incumbent Senator Joseph Fidel retired and left the seat open. Sanchez ran in the three-way June 8, 2008 Democratic Primary but lost by 5 votes to David Ulibarri, who went on to win the seat in the November 4, 2008 General election.

In 2012, Sanchez challenged District 30 incumbent Democratic Senator David Ulibarri in the four-way June 5, 2012 Democratic Primary, winning by 11 votes with 1,237 votes (31.1%) and won the November 6, 2012 General election with 8,844 votes (53%) against Republican nominee Vickie Perea, who was appointed to the New Mexico House of Representatives in 2013 to replace Stephen Easley.

In 2017, Sanchez won the district again in an uncontested race. In 2020, Sanchez was defeated in the Democratic primary by retired teacher Pamela Cordova, who was seen as a progressive alternative to Sanchez. In the 2020 general election, Cordova was defeated by Republican nominee Joshua A. Sanchez.

References

External links
Official page at the New Mexico Legislature

Clemente Sanchez at Ballotpedia
Clemente Sanchez at the National Institute on Money in State Politics

1958 births
Hispanic and Latino American state legislators in New Mexico
Living people
Eastern New Mexico University alumni
New Mexico Highlands University alumni
Democratic Party New Mexico state senators
People from Cibola County, New Mexico
21st-century American politicians
People from Grants, New Mexico